Gamon is a surname. Notable people with the surname include:

Dinah Gamon, English silversmith
Hannibal Gamon ( 1582– 1651), Puritan divine
John Gamon, Canadian scientist
John Gamon (RAF officer) (1898–1976), British RAF pilot in the First World War